Aleksandar Vasilev (19 May 1936 – 23 July 1967) was a Bulgarian footballer who played as a forward. He was a captain of Slavia Sofia in the period 1957–1967. Vasilev scored 100 goals for the club. For the Bulgaria national football team Choko featured in 7 games and scored 2 goals. He won the Bulgarian Cup three times (all with Slavia). He died at the age of 31 years in 1967.

Honours

Individual
 Bulgarian League Top Scorer: 1 time
 1958/59 (with 13 goals for Slavia Sofia)

References

1936 births
1967 deaths
Bulgarian footballers
Bulgaria international footballers
PFC Slavia Sofia players
FC Septemvri Sofia players
First Professional Football League (Bulgaria) players
Association football forwards